The 2014 Waterloo Region municipal elections were held on October 27, 2014 in the Regional Municipality of Waterloo, Ontario, Canada, to elect Waterloo Regional Council, the mayors and city councils of Cambridge, Kitchener, North Dumfries, Waterloo, Wellesley, Wilmot, and Woolwich, the Waterloo Region District School Board (Public), the Waterloo Catholic District School Board, and the regional members of Conseil Scolaire de District Catholiques Centre-Sud and Conseil Scolaire Viamonde (Public). The election was held in conjunction with the provincewide 2014 municipal elections.

Names in bold denotes elected candidates.
(X) denotes incumbent.

Waterloo Regional Council

Chair

Council
Waterloo Regional Council includes the chair, the mayors of the seven constituent municipalities (see below) plus the following council races:

Cambridge

Mayor

Kitchener

Mayor

North Dumfries

Mayor

Waterloo

Mayor

Wellesley

Mayor

Wilmot

Mayor

Woolwich

Mayor

References 

Waterloo
Politics of the Regional Municipality of Waterloo